Air Vice Marshal Kapila Wanigasooriya (also known as Don Kapila Wanigasooriya) USP, MSc (Def Stu), psc is the Director of Welfare for the Sri Lanka Air Force.

Early life
Kapila was educated at Nalanda College, Colombo and he holds a master's degree in Defance Studies (MDS) form University of Kelaniya, Sri Lanka. He is also a graduate of National Defence College in Beijing, China.

Career
Wanigasooriya was one of the pioneers of Sri Lanka Air Force Mi-17 Team. Air Vice Marshal Wanigasooriya commanded No. 6 Squadron SLAF and No. 7 Squadron SLAF. Also he is a VVIP rated helicopter pilot.

References

 8th Batch of the SLAF Finishing School Concludes at Ekala
 CDS Makes His Maiden Visit to SFHQ-E after Assuming Office

Living people
Sri Lanka Air Force air vice-marshals
Sinhalese military personnel
Alumni of Nalanda College, Colombo
Year of birth missing (living people)